The women's 20 kilometres race walk at the 2022 European Athletics Championships took place at the streets of Munich on 20 August.

Records

Schedule

Results
The start on 10:15.

References

Race Walk 20 M
Racewalking at the European Athletics Championships
Euro